John W. Spencer is a retired United States Army officer, researcher of urban warfare, and author. He "currently serves as the chair of urban warfare studies at the Modern War Institute, codirector of the Urban Warfare Project, and host of the Urban Warfare Project Podcast," at the West Point.

During the Russian invasion of Ukraine in 2022, he started to give "how to resist the Russian invasions" through Twitter. This culminated in him releasing "The Mini-Manual for the Urban Defender: A Guide to the Strategies and Tactics of Defending a City", which was translated in more than 10 languages.

Military career
He enlisted in the United States Army as a private, immediately after graduating from high school at the age of 17, eventually reaching the rank of Sergeant first class, until receiving commission; he retired from active service with the rank of major.

During his military career, he was infantry platoon leader and company commander, including two combat tours during the Iraq War. In Iraq, he served during the initial invasion in 2003 and later in 2008 during the Surge and the Battle of Sadr City. He was also assigned to Ranger School, Joint Chiefs of Staff, etc. Later he became a fellow with the chief of staff of the Strategic Studies Group, until he moved to Modern War Institute (MWI).

Work
Currently he is a chair of urban warfare studies at the MWI and a colonel in the California State Guard, where he is assigned as the director of urban warfare training with the 40th Infantry Division.

During the summer of 2022, while Russian invasion of Ukraine was still in progress, he visited Ukraine, "to study the battle of Kyiv."

He is also a contributing editor at War on the Rocks.

Personal life
He's married with three children, living in Colorado Springs, Colorado.

Publications
 Liam Collins and John Spencer, Understanding Urban Warfare (2022; ISBN 978-1912440351)
 John Spenser, Connected Soldiers: Life, Leadership, and Social Connections in Modern War (2022; ISBN 978-1640125124)

References

External links
 Personal Web page

United States Army personnel of the Iraq War
Living people
Military personnel from Indiana
United States Army officers
Georgetown University alumni
United States Military Academy faculty
Year of birth missing (living people)